The 1998 Chinese Football Super Cup (Chinese: 1998年度中国足球超霸杯赛) was the 4th Chinese Football Super Cup, contested by Chinese Jia-A League 1998 winners Dalian Wanda Shide and 1998 Chinese FA Cup winners Shanghai Shenhua. Shanghai Shenhua beat Dalian Wanda Shide 3–0 and won their second Chinese Football Super Cup title.

Match details

References 

1998 in Chinese football
1998